Club Deportivo Euzkadi was an association football team that played in the Primera Fuerza league in Mexico during the 1938–39 season.  It was formed when the Basque Country national football team, which had been touring the world, was refused permission by the world governing body of association football FIFA, to play any more FIFA affiliated teams due to political issues arising from the ongoing Spanish Civil War. As a result of this ruling the team decided to stay in Mexico and participate in the Mexican domestic league under the name Club Deportivo Euzkadi, a move which FIFA allowed.

Origin of team
In 1936 the Spanish Civil War broke out.  On one side was the Republican faction, supported by the Soviet Union and International Brigades, and on the other side was the Nationalist faction,  and supported by the Third Reich and Fascist Italy.
The Basque regional Government in the north of Spain sided with the Republican Government.

In 1937 in the midst of the civil war, José Antonio Aguirre, the first president of the Basque Country (then known as Euzkadi, and currently Euskadi), decided to send the Basque national football team abroad with the duel aim of raising money to take care of the many refugees fleeing the conflict, and also as a form of propaganda to let the world know there was a Basque Government trying to defend itself against the Nationalists. 

This team left Bilbao on 24 April 1937, before arriving in Paris for their first match on 26 April. They toured Europe in the summer of 1937, visiting France, Czechoslovakia, Poland, the Soviet Union, Denmark and Norway, playing a mixture of national and league sides.  They had great success, losing only 4 out of 20 matches, and winning 14.

However their homeland, the Basque Country, was taken by the Nationalist forces, who set up a rival Spanish football federation that demanded the Basque team return to Spain, but the players refused and, traveling aboard the steam ship Ile-de-France which set sail from Le Havre in August 1937, they traveled to Mexico to fulfill their contract to play a series of matches there. At this point the team began to have problems with FIFA. As the team was travelling FIFA informed the Mexican Football Federation that it was not allow to let any of its teams play the Basques, giving no reason. But the Mexican Federation ignored FIFA's instruction and on 3 November 1937 the federation's president and several other important dignitaries were in Veracruz to greet the team when their ship docked.

In its first visit to Mexico, the Basques competed against the Mexico national team four times, winning three of the matches. Also, they played five matches against teams from the Primera Fuerza league, winning three and losing one, and one game against Jalisco State which they won.

Following this the team set off on 10 January 1938 for a tour of South America, beginning with 4 matches in Cuba. They then passed through the Panama Canal, traveling down to Valparaíso in Chile, and then crossing the Andes they travelled to Buenos Aires in Argentina. There they were expecting to play a series of matches against the five biggest Argentine clubs. When the team arrived in Buenos Aires they were told that the matches would not be played due to FIFA's prohibition. The new football federation in Spain had been recognised by FIFA at the beginning of 1938, meaning that at this time Spain had 2 officially recognised football federations. One of the first acts of this new federation was to ask FIFA to "excommunicate" the Basque team. FIFA responded by prohibiting the Argentine clubs from playing the Basque team, and ruling that no other team should play them. However the Basque team, anticipating problems with FIFA, had become affiliated to the Mexican Football Federation a few months earlier, on 8 December 1937, and so there was no legitimate reason to ban them. The Argentine authorities refused to accept the team was affiliated in Mexico and continued to refuse the team permission to play. The real reason for the team not being allowed to play was political in that the Argentine Government had labeled the team as "dangerous Soviet agents" and was keen to support the Nationalists as it was clear by this time that they were winning the war. Argentina was in fact one of the first countries to recognize Francisco Franco as the political leader of Spain. In addition to this FIFA offered all the players money to return to Spain, which they all declined. The cancellation of the tour spelled disaster for the Basque team, most importantly in financial terms, because they had spent all their money traveling to Argentina, believing that they would earn more there. To help them out, the Argentine teams against whom they had been due to play, held a series of "benefit" matches to raise funds for the Basque team.

In May 1938 the team left Argentina traveling again via Chile where they played two matches to raise more money for the journey, and Cuba where they played 8 more. On 3 August 1938 the team arrived back in Mexico. With FIFA still making it difficult for the Basques to arrange matches, and reluctant to split up, the team started to make arrangements with the organizers of the Mexican domestic league with the idea of participating in it. On 2 September 1938 FIFA apologized for their mistakes and declared the team free to play anyone. However although the team now had offers to play in Peru, Costa Rica and the USA the team decided to continue with their plan to integrate into the Mexican league, which began on 27 November 1938.  The Basque Country national football team became a club side. Club Deportivo Euzkadi was born.

Members of the squad

The team consisted of the following players:

The team was managed by Baltazar Junco. Also traveling with the team were Ricardo Irezábal and Manu de la Sota both as delegates, and Melchor Alegría as the organiser.

This was not exactly the same team as the one which had toured Europe the year before. Guillermo Gorostiza and Roberto Etxebarria had left in France after the side decided to travel on to Mexico. They both returned to the Basque Country, being replaced by José Urquiola and Tomas Aguirre respectively. The team's substitute goalkeeper Rafael Eguskiza had become seriously ill in Cuba in the summer of 1938 and could not be part of the team. Ignacio Agirrezabala (Chirri II), who had joined the team for their initial stay in Mexico, left the team while it was in Argentina because his brother lived there, as did Pedro Areso who joined Tigre. Félix de los Heros (known as 'Tache') was brought into the side. The team's trainer, Pedro Vallana, and masseur, Perico Birichinaga, had also left.

The team also suffered a loss during the season when Zubieta was signed for San Lorenzo de Almagro in Argentina, and so missed the last three matches.

The league
Primera Fuerza, also known as La Liga Major., was one of two large association football leagues in Mexico at the time.  Six other teams contested the league.  They were América, Asturias, Atlante, España, Marte and Necaxa. They were all teams from the area around Mexico City.

League matches played
The team started the season well winning 5 of their first 6 matches, but as the season progressed several players became injured, Zubieta left, and due to the small size of the squad their results worsened.

Final score table for 1938/39 season
Club Deportivo Euzkadi finished the season as runners-up to Club Asturias.

Source: rsssf

Stadiums
All league matches in the 1938/39 season were played in just 3 stadiums:  Parque Necaxa, Parque España and Parque Asturias. On the 26 March 1939 Parque Asturias stadium was severely damaged in a fire that began immediately after a match.

Other matches
Apart from participating in the Primera Fuerza league during the 1938/39 season, Club Deportivo Euzkadi also played two friendly matches against a joint Marte/Atlante team (to raise money for poor children and the Mexican Red Cross), one against Atlante, and two others against Tampico.

Break up of the team
The Spanish Civil War ended in April 1939 with the victory of the Nationalists.

On 7 May 1939 the team played their last game as Club Deportivo Euzkadi, which was a 2–7 loss to Club España. Due to this loss the team finished the season as runners-up in the league.

A month after the championship had ended the Basque Country national football team reformed for one last match, played on 18 June 1939, against the Paraguayan side Club Atlético Corrales. Included in the squad was the Basque goalkeeper Joaquín Urkiaga who had played the season in Club Asturias. The match ended as a 4–4 draw.

After this match the team disbanded, and the players each received their first and only payment which was 10,000 pesetas. The players then joined various league sides in Mexico and Argentina. Cilauren, Alonso, Barcos, Blasco, Iborra, Muguerza, Aedo and Iraragorri signed for Club España. The Reguiero brothers, Urquiola, Agirre and Larrinaga signed for Club Asturias. Lángara joined San Lorenzo de Almagro in Argentina, where Zubieta had gone mid-season.

Legacy
The main legacy of the team was the impulse it gave to the professionalization of association football in Mexico. When the team arrived in Mexico in 1937 all its players were already professionals, whereas most Mexican players were not paid openly, and instead were employed in certain jobs where they were given special conditions so that they could play sport. With the arrival of the Basque team the number of spectators increased enormously and radio began to broadcast matches, so that Mexican footballers began to realize that they could begin to live only from football.

See also
Football in Spain
Football in Mexico

References

Football in the Basque Country (autonomous community)
Primera Fuerza teams
Defunct football clubs in Mexico City
Association football clubs established in 1938
Association football clubs disestablished in 1939
1938 establishments in Mexico
1930s disestablishments in Mexico
Exiles of the Spanish Civil War in Mexico
Spanish expatriate sportspeople in Mexico